The Bahamas competed at the 2022 Commonwealth Games in Birmingham, England between 28 July and 8 August 2022. It was the team's sixteenth appearance at the Games.

In June 2022, a team of 28 athletes was announced. Swimmers Izaak Bastian and Lilly Higgs were the country's flagbearers during the opening ceremony.

Medalists

Competitors
The Bahamas will send a contingent of 28 competitors to the Games.

The following is the list of number of competitors participating at the Games per sport/discipline.

Athletics

As of 14 June 2022, a squad of eleven athletes – including Tokyo 2020 champion Steven Gardiner – will take part in the competition.

Men
Track and road events

Field events

Combined events – Decathlon

Women
Track and road events

Boxing

As of 14 June 2022, a squad of two boxers will take part in the competition.

Men

Cycling

As of 14 June 2022, a squad of two cyclists will take part in the competition.

Road
Men

Judo

As of 14 June 2022, a squad of two judoka will take part in the competition.

Swimming

As of 14 June 2022, a squad of eight swimmers will take part in the competition.

Men

Women

Mixed

Triathlon

As of 14 June 2022, one triathlete will take part in the competition.

Individual

Wrestling

As of 14 June 2022, a squad of two wrestlers will take part in the competition.

References

External links
Bahamas Olympic Committee Official site

Nations at the 2022 Commonwealth Games
Bahamas at the Commonwealth Games
2022 in Bahamian sport